Al-Quds Open University is an independent, distance education public university in Palestine. It was created by a decree issued by the Palestinian Liberation Organization (PLO) in 1991.

QOU is the first Open Learning institute in the Palestinian territories. It has 60,000 students studying in 19 branches and centers distributed all over the West Bank and the Gaza Strip.

Faculties 
QOU has a Faculty of Graduate Studies, which leads to the master's degree in the following specializations:
 Arabic Language & Literature.
 Psychological & Educational Guidance.

The university has seven faculties leading to a BA Degree in:
 Technology and Applied Sciences.
 Agriculture.
 Social and Family Development.
 Administrative and Economic Sciences.
 Media.
 Arts.
 Education.
 The university has announced plans to create Post Graduate School in the future.

University Centers 
The university has six centers located in the Palestinian Territories, as follows:
The Information and Communication Technology Center (ICTC) is responsible for the technical development, computerizing all administrative, academic, financial and productive works of the university.
The Continuing Education Center (CEC) was created to make connections between academic knowledge and practical experience.
Media Production Center (MPC): This center is responsible for producing educational multimedia to support the philosophy of distance education. The center uses audio-video, video editing units, graphics and filming.
Open Learning Center (OLC): OLC is an educational/technical center in Al-Quds Open University, established in 2008. 

The Measurement and Evaluation Center conducts training for evaluation and the development of tests and measurement processes. 

Future Studies & Opinion Measurement Center.

Achievements 
Al-Quds Educational Channel is the latest educational method of Al Quds Open University in the field of e learning.
Al-Quds Educational Channel Frequency (Nile sat 12645/horizontal/coding rate: 6/5)
Century International Golden Quality Era Business Initiative Directions (BID) in 2015, a vanity award

Opening Faculty of Graduate Studies 2015/2016.
Opening Faculty of Media, which offers media specialization.
Increasing the number of students to 60,000 which makes it the biggest non-campus university in Palestine.
Opening 19 branches and study centers.
The establishment of the biggest computerized network in Palestine by the ICTC which is an accredited testing center for specialized international certificates. It also has most of its systems and curricula computerized. The network, a partnership with the Palestinian Development Gateway, was funded by the Programme for Assistance to the Palestinian People, part of the United Nations Development Programme.

For more information about QOU achievements, see

Al-Quds Open University's membership in Arab and international educational unions
 Association of Arab Universities
 Federation of the Universities of the Islamic World
 The International Council for Open Distance Education
 Asian Association of Open Universities
 Open Digital Space Organization for the Mediterranean

The university is twinned with Goldsmiths Student Union in London, UK, after Goldsmiths students passed a motion in support of Palestinians' right to education and began a Twinning Campaign to 'twin' their University with Al-Quds and secure two scholarships for two Al-Quds Open University students onto Goldsmiths courses. In May 2008 the Dean of Student Affairs equivalent of Al-Quds Student President visited Goldsmiths, spending a week with students and staff.

See also
 List of Palestinian universities
 Education in the Palestinian territories

References

External links
 University homepage 
 homepage 
 University homepage 
 The Roles of Palestinian Intellectuals in Israel and the Occupied Palestinian Territories: a project of the Alternative Information Center and Open University
 Canada
 Management Role of al Quds Open University

Educational institutions established in 1991
1991 establishments in the Palestinian territories
Al-Quds Open University